Balabanski Crag (‘Balabanski Kamak’ \ba-la-'ban-ski 'ka-m&k\) is the rocky peak rising to 833 m in eastern Bigla Ridge on Heros Peninsula, Foyn Coast on the Antarctic Peninsula.  It surmounts Cabinet Inlet to the northeast.

The feature is named after Dimitar Balabanski, physicist at St. Kliment Ohridski Base in 1994/95 and subsequent seasons.

Location
British mapping in 1974.

Maps
 British Antarctic Territory: Graham Land.  Scale 1:250000 topographic map.  BAS 250 Series, Sheet SQ 19–20.  London, 1974.
 Antarctic Digital Database (ADD). Scale 1:250000 topographic map of Antarctica. Scientific Committee on Antarctic Research (SCAR). Since 1993, regularly upgraded and updated.

Notes

References
 Balabanski Crag. SCAR Composite Antarctic Gazetteer.
 Bulgarian Antarctic Gazetteer. Antarctic Place-names Commission. (details in Bulgarian, basic data in English)

External links
 Balabanski Crag. Copernix satellite image

Mountains of Graham Land
Foyn Coast
Bulgaria and the Antarctic